Macau's Paralympic Committee was founded in 1979, and the territory first competed at the Summer Paralympic Games in 1988. It has competed in every edition of the Summer Games since then, but has never participated in the Winter Paralympic Games.

Macau has also had an Olympic committee since 1987, which is recognized by Asian Olympic Committees and Portuguese Speaking Olympic Committees, but not recognized by the International Olympic Committee. Should athletes in the territory wish to compete in the Olympic Games, they would need to compete for the People's Republic of China. However, this conflicts with the Macau Basic Law (Macau must participate in any international activities as an independent entity different from mainland China), so no athletes in Macau have had the chance to participate in the Olympic Games so far.

See also
 Sport in Macau
 Macau Sports and Olympic Committee

References